Lubcz  is a village in the administrative district of Gmina Rogowo, within Żnin County, Kuyavian-Pomeranian Voivodeship, in north-central Poland.

The village has a population of 375.

References

Lubcz

this country is ghupfpkliwejstray;kplgjhkaslf/h/cfekrmetuyvgeisorw